Haustellum tweedianum, common name : the Tweed murex, is a species of sea snail, a marine gastropod mollusk in the family Muricidae, the murex snails or rock snails.

Description
The shell of an adult specimen varies between 50 mm and 80 mm.

Distribution
This marine species can be found off South Queensland and New South Wales, Australia.

References

 Macpherson, J.H. 1959. New gastropods from North Australia. Memoirs of the National Museum of Victoria, Melbourne 24: 51–57, 1 pl.
 Macpherson, J.H. 1962. New name for Murex espinosus Macp. Memoirs of the National Museum of Victoria 25: 176
 Ponder, W.F. & Vokes, E.H. 1988. A revision of the Indo-West Pacific fossil and recent species of Murex s.s. and Haustellum (Mollusca: Gastropoda: Muricidae). Records of the Australian Museum 8: 1–160
 Wilson, B. 1994. Australian Marine Shells. Prosobranch Gastropods. Kallaroo, WA : Odyssey Publishing Vol. 2 370 pp. 
 Merle D., Garrigues B. & Pointier J.-P. (2011) Fossil and Recent Muricidae of the world. Part Muricinae. Hackenheim: Conchbooks. 648 pp. page(s): 69
 Houart R. (2014). Living Muricidae of the world. Muricinae. Murex, Promurex, Haustellum, Bolinus, Vokesimurex and Siratus. Harxheim: ConchBooks. 197 pp.

External links
  Ponder W.F. & Vokes E.H. (1988) A revision of the Indo-West Pacific fossil and Recent species of Murex s.s. and Haustellum (Mollusca: Gastropoda: Muricidae). Records of the Australian Museum suppl.8: 1–160
 

Haustellum
Gastropods of Australia
Gastropods described in 1962